The Vallée des Merveilles, also known in Italian as the Valle delle Meraviglie, is a part of the Mercantour National Park in southern France. It holds the largest quantity of open-air Bronze Age petroglyphs in Europe, after Val Camonica in Italy, and is given special note for the area's inclusion for the European Diploma of Protected Areas.

Location 

The valley is located near the Italian border, in the rugged mountains of the Argentera massif within the Maritime Alps, between Saint-Martin-Vésubie and Tende.

Petroglyphs 
The petroglyphs (rock engravings), located on stone outcrops within the valley, were first identified by British amateur archaeologist Clarence Bicknell in 1881. Between 1897 and 1902, Bicknell copied and catalogued more than 10,000 drawings.

Beginning in 1967, an extensive study of the petroglyphs was begun by French archaeologist Henry de Lumley. De Lumley and a team of his postgraduate students classified the petroglyphs in the 40 km2 area, with the greatest concentration in a 14 km2 archaeological site on the slope of Mount Bégo. the engravings display objects like daggers, axes, and scythes. Suns, stars and spirals are represented. Ovals with criss-crossed lines may represent land or the earth. Some anthropomorphic figures have been found. The most common drawings are of horned animals.

Henry de Lumley has theorized the petroglyphs are the work of a Mediterranean Bronze Age people who worshipped the bull and for whom Mount Bégo was a sacred site.

The Musée des Merveilles at Tende houses numerous castings of the petroglyphs.

References

External links

  Mount Bego prehistoric rock carvings by Nicoletta Bianchi
  Official site of marvels museum from Tende
  Entretien avec la directrice du Musée des Merveilles
 
  Stèle pour stèle dans la Vallée des Merveilles film by Robert Field, 1989, 12 minutes. Production SFRS/CERIMES.
  La Vallée des merveilles – Les gravures rupestres de l'âge du bronze film by Henry de Lumley, 1971, 21 minutes. Production SFRS/CERIMES.

Landforms of Alpes-Maritimes
Mercantour National Park
Rock art in France
Petroglyphs
Landforms of Provence-Alpes-Côte d'Azur
Valleys of France
Bronze Age France
Archaeology of Provence-Alpes-Côte d'Azur